Bethel may refer to the following in the U.S. state of Oregon:

 Bethel, Eugene, Oregon, a neighborhood in Eugene
 Bethel, Polk County, Oregon, an unincorporated community
 Bethel Elementary School, in the Salem-Keizer School District, named after the Bethel Church, built in that locale by the Dunkard Brethren

See also 
 Bethel (disambiguation)
 Bethel School District (Oregon), in the Bethel neighborhood of Eugene